Terrestrials is a collaborative studio album by American drone metal band Sunn O))) and Norwegian experimental music group Ulver. Produced by Stephen O'Malley and Kristoffer Rygg, it was released on February 3, 2014, via Southern Lord Records.  It has been described as "three live improvisation pieces".

On December 10, 2013, a sample from the closing track, "Eternal Return", was released for streaming. It was also streamed on Pitchfork Advance on the day it was released until February 10, 2014.

Background
The relationship between Ulver and Sunn O))) extends to the mid-1990s, when Stephen O'Malley interviewed Kristoffer Rygg for various magazines.  Ulver produced a track on Sunn O)))'s White1 and O'Malley played with Rygg and Daniel O'Sullivan, also of Ulver, in the ambient/noise band, Aethenor. Sunn O))) was invited to perform at the Øya festival in Oslo, at which time Rygg proposed that the band remain in the country for several additional days in order to collaborate. The bands created "the foundations for a bunch of tracks" at Ulver's studio, Crystal Canyon, and then Ulver prepared the preliminary arrangements and mix.  The bands collaborated on the production, which, as O'Malley explained,

As O'Malley explained of the three "live improvisation pieces" comprising the album, "I remember the vibe in the room back then was more rāga than it was rock. And despite the fact that the walls were literally shaking from volume, it was actually quite a blissed out, psychedelic session. I wanted to preserve that vibe in the final mix".

Critical reception

Upon its release, Terrestrials received positive reviews from music critics. At Metacritic, which assigns a normalized rating out of 100 to reviews from critics, the album received an average score of 77, which indicates "generally favorable reviews", based on 18 reviews.  Tristan Bath, writing for The Quietus, described the collaboration as "a meeting of chameleonic polyglots, and the result is most unexpectedly beautiful and luminescent".  The Guardian'''s Jamie Thomson noted that the interaction between Ulver and Sunn O))) "isn't just greater than the sum of its parts; it's a distinct journey between two disparate musical camps" that is "long, languorous and wonderful in its invention, with Ulver lending emotional heft to Sunn O)))'s wall of tone".  Writing for Allmusic, Thom Jurek lauded the album, as "it perfectly reflects both Sunn O)))'s impenetrably emotional dark heart and Ulver's expertly crafted senses of drama and dynamic".  Ray Van Horn Jr., writing for Blabbermouth, described the album as "one of the most fascinating albums in either act's careers."

However, the album did receive some qualified criticism, with Consequence of Sounds Adam Kivel suggesting that the "collaboration doesn't quite rival the strongest albums of either band's catalog, but Sunn O))) and Ulver have produced an ecstatic, beautiful piece of experimental metal that celebrates the strengths of both bands".  Grayson Currin of Pitchfork also indicated that the impact of the songs proved fleeting: "After the sun rises on these meditations, then, you can simply go about your daily routine, somewhat elevated but mostly unaltered".

Track listing

Daymare 2CD Bonus Tracks

PersonnelSunn O)))Greg Anderson
Stephen O'MalleyUlverDaniel O'Sullivan – guitars
Kristoffer Rygg – vocals, programming
Jørn H. Sværen – instrumentals
Tore Ylwizaker – keyboards, programmingAdditional musiciansOle Henrik Moe – viola, violin
Kari Rønnekleiv – viola, violin
Stig Espen Hundsnes – trumpet
Tomas Pettersen – drumsProduction'''
Anders Møller – mixing
Jaime Gomez Arellano – mastering 
Stephen O’Malley – production, art direction
Kristoffer Rygg – production

Charts

References

External links

2014 albums
Collaborative albums
Sunn O))) albums
Ulver albums
Southern Lord Records albums